Geneviève Laureau (born 25 January   1941 at Orleans) is a former French athlete, who specialized in the  high jump.

Biography  
Geneviève Laureau won three championship titles of France in the high jump in 1963, 1965 and 1966.

In 1963, she set a new French record in the high jump jumping 1.72 m.

Prize list  
 French Championships in Athletics   :
 3 times winner of the high jump in 1963,  1965 and 1966.

Records

Notes and references
 Docathlé2003, Fédération française d'athlétisme, 2003, p. 414

1941 births
Living people
French female high jumpers
Sportspeople from Orléans